KFXZ (1520 kHz) is a commercial AM radio station in Lafayette, Louisiana.  It is owned by Delta Media and broadcasts a news/talk radio format.  KFXZ's studios and offices are on Evangeline Thruway in Carencro.  The transmitter is in Lafayette, northeast of the I-10/I-49 interchange.

By day, KFXZ is powered at 10,000 watts.  But to protect Class A Clear-channel stations KOKC in Oklahoma City and WWKB in Buffalo from interference, KFXZ reduces its power to 500 watts at night and sends most of its signal southward while nulling it to the north, east, and west. The station is owned and operated by Charles Chatelain's Delta Media Corporation.  Programming is also heard on FM translator 98.5 K253CO in Lafayette.

Programming
KFXZ mostly carries nationally syndicated shows.  Weekdays begin with "This Morning, America's First News with Gordon Deal."  That's followed by Glenn Beck; "Markley, Van Camp and Robbins"; Todd Schnitt; Joe Pags; Lars Larson and "Our American Stories with Lee Habeeb."  Weekends feature shows on money, health, real estate, barbecue and auto repair.  Weekend hosts include Jim Bohannon, Bill Cunningham and "The Jesus Christ Show with Neil Saavedra."

The station does have two local programs that air weekdays "Austins on the Air" and "The Ross Report"

History
In 1960, the station first signed on as KXKW.  In March 1990, the call sign was changed to KINF, then to KACY in July 1990, followed by KDYS in September 1996, and in August 2004, the station was assigned its current callsign KFXZ.

On October 28, 2012, KFXZ changed the format from urban gospel to urban adult contemporary, branded as "Z 1520", picking up the format from KFXZ-FM 105.9, which flipped to country music.

On May 1, 2013, KFXZ changed its format to Spanish language adult hits, branded as "Juan AM 1520".

On November 1, 2015, KFXZ flipped to Regional Mexican music, branded as "El Sabor", simulcasting KSLO-FM.

On July 1, 2020, KFXZ dropped its simulcast and began stunting with Christmas music, in advance of a change of format. On July 17, 2020, KFXZ switched to talk radio, branded as "News Talk 98.5" (simulcast on FM translator K253CO 98.5 FM Lafayette). It also picked up a simulcast partner serving the Lake Charles area, KLCJ (104.1 FM). On February 7, 2022, KLCJ switched to simulcasting KLWB-FM.

Previous logos

References

External links
FCC History Cards for KFXZ

FXV
News and talk radio stations in the United States